Assisted suicide, while criminal does not appear to have caused any convictions. Although a person who has assisted with the suicide must appear in court, article 37 of the Penal Code (effective 1934) states: "The judges are authorized to forego [sic] punishment of a person whose previous life has been honorable where he commits a homicide motivated by compassion, induced by repeated requests of the victim.". Whilst not de jure permitting the act, it has been interpreted to mean that judges may pardon the defendant of their crime, and so de facto authorising assisted suicide.

This is further reinforced in another article, 127,  which states that the judge could waive the doctor, if this action was made by patient pledge and the doctor had an honorable reputation. This de facto permissive stance has led the respected Hungarian medical journal Orvosi Hetilap to consider Uruguay as having legalised a form of active euthanasia.

The Penal Code of Uruguay of Uruguay is seemingly the first legal document that include euthanasia. The main source of this Penal Code was Jimenéz de Asúa, a Spanish penalist, that introduce this concept in his book "Libertad de amar y derecho a morir: ensayos de un criminalista sobre eugenesia, eutanasia, endocrinología", published in Madrid/Spain, in 1928.  The first proposal to understand Euthanasia as homicide was made by Ruy Santos in his MD thesis, "Da resistencia dos estados mórbidos à therapeutica e da incurabilidade perante a euthanásia", at Faculdade de Medicina da Bahia/Brazil, in 1928. He made a difference between Euthanasia as homicide and Euthanasia as suicide, probably the first citation about Assisted Suicide.

Minors
If parents attempt to refuse treatment to a minor, against the advice of the attending physician, then they would be in abuse of their parental authority, as they would be deemed to not always be acting in their child's best interests.

Article 37
Article 37 was for years at odds with the country's otherwise conservative opposition to abortion, which until 2012 was illegal except in cases of protecting the mother’s life, rape or extreme poverty.

References

Uruguay
Law of Uruguay
Health in Uruguay
Death in Uruguay